Zico Buurmeester (born 7 June 2002) is a Dutch professional footballer who plays as a midfielder for Dutch club AZ.

Career
Buurmeester signed his first professional contract with Jong AZ on 24 January 2020. He made his professional debut with Jong AZ in a 6–2 Eerste Divisie loss to FC Volendam on 19 October 2020.

Personal life
His younger brother Jesse signed his first pro contract with AZ in June 2021.

References

External links
 

2002 births
Living people
People from Egmond
Dutch footballers
Footballers from North Holland
Association football midfielders
Netherlands youth international footballers
Eredivisie players
Eerste Divisie players
Jong AZ players
AZ Alkmaar players